The Men's 2011 European Amateur Boxing Championships was held in Ankara, Turkey from June 17 to June 24, 2011. It was the 39th edition of this biennial competition organised by the European governing body for amateur boxing, the EUBC.

Schedule
From 17 June–19 June the preliminaries were held, on June 20–21 the quarterfinals in all categories were held. The semifinals took place on June 23 with the finals at June 24.

Seventeen-year-old Salman Alizadeh from Azerbaijan became the youngest gold medal winner in the European Boxing Championships since Mario Bianchini in 1930.

Medal winners

Medal table

References

External links
Results
Draws  
 

European Amateur Boxing Championships
European Amateur Boxing Championships
2011 European Amateur Boxing Championships
European 2011
European Amateur Boxing Championships
June 2011 sports events in Turkey
2010s in Ankara